Arnshöfen is an Ortsgemeinde – a community belonging to a Verbandsgemeinde – in the Westerwaldkreis in Rhineland-Palatinate, Germany. It belongs to the Verbandsgemeinde of Wallmerod, a kind of collective municipality.

Geography

Location
The community lies in the Westerwald between Montabaur and Hachenburg, right near the Westerwald Lake Plateau.

Constituent communities
Arnshöfen's Ortsteile are Arnshöfen, Etzelbach and Niederdorf.

History
In 1525, Arnshöfen had its first documentary mention.

Politics

The municipal council is made up of 6 council members who were elected in a majority vote in a municipal election on 7 June 2009.

Economy and infrastructure

Right through the community runs Bundesstraße 8, which links Altenkirchen (Westerwald) and Limburg an der Lahn. The nearest Autobahn interchange is Montabaur on Bundesautobahn 3 (Cologne–Frankfurt am Main), some 15 km away. The nearest InterCityExpress stop is the railway station at Montabaur on the Cologne-Frankfurt high-speed rail line.

References

External links
 Arnshöfen 

Municipalities in Rhineland-Palatinate
Westerwaldkreis